Eetu Koski (born 29 July 1992) is a Finnish professional ice hockey player currently playing for Lukko of the Finnish Liiga.

References

External links

1992 births
Living people
Finnish ice hockey centres
Lukko players
People from Uusikaupunki
Sportspeople from Southwest Finland